LeRoy Hurd (born May 26, 1980) is an American professional basketball player who last played for CSU Sibiu of the Romanian Liga Națională.

Hurd was a multi-sport superstar at Moss Point High School before a five-inch growth spurt made a future in basketball possible. Hurd attended the University of Miami(2000 Big East Champions and Sweet 16) for two years before transferring to the University of Texas at San Antonio. His first year at UTSA was a mediocre season for his team although Hurd was named Southland Conference newcomer of the year. In 2003–2004 Hurd was named the 2004 Southland Conference Most Valuable Player after leading the conference in scoring with 19.4 points per game. He also averaged 8.2 rebounds and helped UTSA become the Southland regular season and tournament champions, as well as an NCAA tournament appearance. Hurd was also named an honorable mention All-American by The Associated Press and recently named Southland Conference 2000's Co-Player of the Decade.
Hurd went undrafted and briefly played for the Columbus Riverdragons before moving on to Sutor Basket Montegranaro, Teramo Basket, Solsonica Rieti, Scavolini Pesaro, Anibal Zahle and Virtus Bologna.

On December 12, 2014 he signed with Romanian club CSU Sibiu.

Criminal conviction 
In June 2016, Hurd pleaded guilty in Albemarle County, Virginia Circuit Court to two counts of using a computer to solicit a minor. The charge was based on a relationship between Hurd, then 34, and a student at a high school where Hurd was an athletics coach.  Hurd was sentenced to three years in prison.

References 

1980 births
Living people
African-American basketball players
American expatriate basketball people in Italy
American expatriate basketball people in Lebanon
American expatriate basketball people in Romania
American expatriate basketball people in the United Arab Emirates
American men's basketball players
Basketball players from Mississippi
Columbus Riverdragons players
CSU Sibiu players
Nuova AMG Sebastiani Basket Rieti players
Miami Hurricanes men's basketball players
People from Pascagoula, Mississippi
Shooting guards
Small forwards
Sutor Basket Montegranaro players
Teramo Basket players
UTSA Roadrunners men's basketball players
Victoria Libertas Pallacanestro players
Virtus Bologna players
21st-century African-American sportspeople
20th-century African-American people